The Dark at the Top of the Stairs is a 1957 play by William Inge about family conflicts during the early 1920s in a small Oklahoma town. It was nominated for the Tony Award for Best Play in 1958 and was made into a film of the same name in 1960.  It is the most autobiographical of all Inge plays.

Plot
The drama centers on Cora Flood, the wife of traveling salesman Rubin Flood. After she learns that her husband might be having a romantic relationship with another woman, she plans to leave the marriage and move in with her sister. Meanwhile, their shy daughter prepares for her first dance and their pre-teen son takes refuge from bullies in a scrapbook of movie stars. Rubin, who has lost his job, returns, and Cora must decide whether to stand by her man.

Play

Directed by Elia Kazan, the play opened December 5, 1957 at New York's Music Box Theatre and ran for a total of 468 performances, closing on January 17, 1959. The drama was reworked by Inge from his earlier play Farther Off from Heaven, first staged in 1947 at Margo Jones' Theatre '47 in Dallas, Texas.

Opening night cast:
 Eileen Heckart as Lottie Lacey
 Pat Hingle as Rubin Flood
 Teresa Wright as Cora Flood
 Timmy Everett as Sammy Goldenbaum
 Frank Overton as Morris Lacey
 Anthony Ray as Chauffeur
 Evans Evans as Flirt Conroy
 Carl Reindel as Punky Givens
 Judith Robinson as Reenie Flood
 Charles Saari as Sonny Flood
 Jonathan Shawn as Boy Offstage

It was nominated for five Tony Awards: Best Play, Best Featured Actor (Pat Hingle), Best Featured Actress (Eileen Heckart), Best Scenic Design (Ben Edwards), Best Director (Elia Kazan). Timmy Everett won a Theatre World Award. It was adapted into a film by the same name in 1960, directed by Delbert Mann, and starring Dorothy McGuire and Robert Preston.

See also
 List of American films of 1960

References

1957 plays
Plays set in Oklahoma
American plays adapted into films
Plays by William Inge
Fiction set in the 1920s
Tony Award-winning plays